Brighthampton is a hamlet about  south of Witney in West Oxfordshire and contiguous with the village of Standlake.

Archaeology
A large pagan burial ground from the 5th and 6th centuries has been found south of Malthouse Farm in Brighthampton. It was revealed when ploughing disturbed human bones in 1820. Excavation in 1857–58 found 54 burials, 10 cremation burials and a wide range grave goods, which are now in the Ashmolean Museum in Oxford. Notable artefacts found include an iron sword with a gilt scabbard and an ornate gilt brooch. Since then set of six burials was found at Malthouse Farm in 1892, and the burial of a child was found in 1949.

History
Brighthampton's toponym means Beorhthelm's tūn. In the 10th century it was part of the royal manor of Bampton, and in 984 Æthelred II gave land at Brighthampton to one of his ministers. The Domesday Book records that in 1086 William the Conqueror's half-brother Odo, Bishop of Bayeux was Brighthampton's feudal overlord. However, William I imprisoned Odo from 1082 until 1087 and confiscated his lands. In 1131 Henry I granted land at Brighthampton to Sées Priory in Normandy. This is likely to have been the same land that William I had confiscated from Odo. At the same time Henry granted land at Hardwick to the same priory, and these together became a single manor of Hardwick and Brighthampton.  There is a record from early in the 17th century of Brighthampton having a stone cross, and in 1857 it was recorded that there was still the base of an "ancient" stone cross (presumably medieval) at the hamlet's central crossroads.

Historic buildings
Forge Cottage is a 16th-century timber-framed building supported by a central cruck. By 1776 it was trading as a public house, the Red Lion. Another pub in Brighthampton, the Golden Balls, had been licensed by 1753. It was rebuilt early in the 20th century, ceased trading in 1992 and was demolished in 1994.  The farmhouse of Manor Farm (also called Florey's Farm) is of Cotswold stone and was built early in the 17th century. It was extended in the middle of the 17th century and again in the 19th century.

Baptist chapel
A few families of nonconformists were recorded in the parish in the latter part of the 17th century, and in the 18th century several local families were Anabaptists who attended a chapel in Cote. A Baptist chapel was built between Brighthampton and Standlake in 1832, flourished in the 1840s and 50's and a gallery was added to increase capacity in 1865. In the 20th century falling attendances led to services being discontinued in 1937, but they were resumed in 1951. The chapel finally closed in 1978 and in 1994 it was serving as the offices of a missionary society. It is now a private house.

References

Sources and further reading

Hamlets in Oxfordshire